The Latin Grammy Award for Best Portuguese Language Album is given every year since the 1st Latin Grammy Awards ceremony which took place at the Staples Center in Los Angeles, California. In 2009 the category was divided in Best Native Brazilian Roots Album and Best Tropical Brazilian Roots Album. In 2010 the category was renamed to Best Native Brazilian Roots Album. The category was changed to its current name in 2018.

According to the category description guide for the 13th Latin Grammy Awards, the award is for vocal or instrumental Portuguese Language Roots albums containing at least 51% playing time of newly recorded material.  For Solo artists, duos or groups.

In 2001, As Canções de Eu Tu Eles by Gilberto Gil became the first album to win this award and to be nominated for Album of the Year. Gilberto Gil and Renato Teixeira hold the record of most wins in the category with three wins each. Teixeira has won in collaboration with Sérgio Reis in 2015 and alongside Almir Sater in 2016 and 2018.

Winners and nominees

2000s

2010s

2020s

References

External links
Official site of the Latin Grammy Awards

 
Brazilian Roots Album